Glenea albolineata is a species of beetle in the family Cerambycidae. It was described by James Thomson in 1860.

Subspecies
 Glenea albolineata albolineata Thomson, 1860
 Glenea albolineata buruensis Breuning, 1958
 Glenea albolineata lumawigi Breuning, 1980
 Glenea albolineata mindanaonis Aurivillius, 1926
 Glenea albolineata obiensis Breuning, 1950
 Glenea albolineata uniformis Breuning, 1958

References

albolineata
Beetles described in 1860